Neocoenyra heckmanni is a butterfly in the family Nymphalidae. It is found in Tanzania.

Subspecies
Neocoenyra heckmanni heckmanni (southern Tanzania)
Neocoenyra heckmanni kennethi Kielland, 1990 (eastern Tanzania)
Neocoenyra heckmanni mangalisa Kielland, 1990 (central Tanzania)
Neocoenyra heckmanni mbinga Kielland, 1990 (southern Tanzania)
Neocoenyra heckmanni uzungwae Kielland, 1990 (south-central Tanzania)

References

Satyrini
Butterflies described in 1903
Endemic fauna of Tanzania
Butterflies of Africa